Fuyajou Eden (不夜城エデン) is the ninth studio album by Japanese rock band Alice Nine. It was released on April 29, 2020 in two editions: the regular edition containing only the CD and the fan club limited edition containing the CD and two DVDs.

Overview 
After leaving PS Company in 2014, the band changed the name Alice Nine. (ア リ ス 九號.) to A9. In 2019, the group returned to their old name and "Fuyajou Eden" was described as "Alice Nine's first album in 11 years". The music video for "Testament" aired on YouTube on March 22, 2020, showing a mix of the band's old and new sound.

Fuyajou Eden was produced by Japanese music producer nishi-ken. The track "Tsumibito" (罪人) was inspired by the Children of the Whales manga.

Charts 
The album peaked at the 57th position on the Oricon Albums Chart.

Tour 
The national tour for the album's release, called "Alice Nine. ONEMAN TOUR 2020「 Fuyajou touhikou 」" featured twelve dates across Japan. The first performance, on April 28, was limited to fan club members.

Track listing

Regular edition

Limited fan club edition

Personnel 
 Shou (将) – vocal
 Hiroto (ヒロト) – guitar
 Tora (虎) – guitar
 Saga (沙我) – bass
 Nao (ナオ) – drums

References 

2020 albums
Alice Nine albums
Japanese-language albums